Salim Mahsas (born 18 June 1991) is an Algerian footballer who plays for US Ivry as a midfielder.

References

External links

1991 births
Living people
Association football midfielders
Algerian footballers
RC Arbaâ players
21st-century Algerian people